John Stuart Gaden  (born 13 November 1941) is an Australian actor and director known particularly for his stage career, although he has also made some film and television appearances.

Career
John Gaden was born in Sydney where his father owned a successful legal practice, Gadens.  He attended Cranbrook School, Sydney, where he performed in various school plays. After school he studied arts and law at the University of Sydney.  After appearing with the Sydney University Dramatic Society, he decided to pursue a theatrical career in lieu of a legal one.

His professional career started in the early 1960s. In 1970 he appeared in a production of Hadrian the Seventh in Perth, directed by Sir Tyrone Guthrie, and with fellow actors Arthur Dignam and Judy Nunn. Guthrie was impressed enough with Gaden to recommend him to Robin Lovejoy, who cast him in a production of The Crucible, which resulted in a positive review from The Sydney Morning Herald'''s theatre critic Harry Kippax, which in turn led to a three-year contract with the Old Tote Theatre Company (the precursor of the Sydney Theatre Company). He has also recorded audiobooks of British children's series Fireman Sam and Australian children's series Magic Mountain.

For three years he was associate director of the Sydney Theatre Company with Richard Wherrett, during which time he directed and co-directed the notable production of The Life and Times of Nicholas Nickleby.

He performed many roles with Sydney's Nimrod Theatre Company in the 1970s.  From 1986 to 1989 he was artistic director of the State Theatre Company of South Australia, based in Adelaide.Daniel Meyer-Dinkgrafe, ed., Who's Who in Contemporary World Theatre. Retrieved 2 April 2015  In Adelaide he co-directed various productions with Gale Edwards.  He has also appeared with the Belvoir St Theatre and the Queensland Theatre Company.

Awards
John Gaden was appointed a Member of the Order of Australia (AM) in the 1986 Australia Day Honours for his services to the performing arts. He was appointed an Officer of the Order of Australia (AO) at the 2018 Australia Day Honours.

He was won two Helpmann Awards for Best Male Actor in a Play: in 2001, for Yasmina Reza's The Unexpected Man, and in 2007, for The Lost Echo.  In 2005 he won a Helpmann Award for Best Male Actor in a Supporting Role in a Play for Michael Frayn's Democracy.

Personal
He is divorced, and has a son and three grandchildren. He lives alone.

Notable stage appearances
 King Lear (William Shakespeare; 1967, 1988, 2009; in 1988, his Fool was Geoffrey Rush)
 Big Toys (Patrick White; 1977, Old Tote)
 Signal Driver (Patrick White; 1985)
 Cloudstreet (Tim Winton; 1998)
 The Unexpected Man (2000)
 Copenhagen (Michael Frayn; 2002; Michael Blakemore's production)
 Tiresias in The Lost Echo (2006; Barrie Kosky's production)
 No Man's Land (Harold Pinter; 2011, for Queensland Theatre Company and STC)
 Rosencrantz and Guildenstern Are Dead (Tom Stoppard; 2013)
 The War of the Roses (STC, with Cate Blanchett)
 The Trial (Franz Kafka)
 The Wild Duck (Henrik Ibsen)
 The Seagull (Anton Chekhov)
 Kold Komfort Kaffee (with Robyn Archer)
 Pericles and Henry IV (Shakespeare; for Bell Shakespeare)
 Source= AusStage
Selected film and television appearances
 The Taming of the Shrew (1973)
 Conferenceville (1984)
 Muriel's Wedding (1994)
 Halifax f.p. (1994)
 Children of the Revolution (1996)
 Thank God He Met Lizzie (1997)
 A Little Bit of Soul (1998)
 Right Here Right Now (2004)
 Rake (2010)
 The Eye of the Storm'' (2011)

References

1941 births
Living people
Australian male stage actors
Australian male film actors
Australian male television actors
Officers of the Order of Australia
Male actors from Sydney
Helpmann Award winners
People educated at Cranbrook School, Sydney